"Grazing in the Grass" is an instrumental composed by Philemon Hou and first recorded by the South African trumpeter Hugh Masekela. Released in the United States as a single in 1968, it followed United States trumpeter Herb Alpert's vocal performance of "This Guy's in Love with You" to the top spot on the Hot 100 chart, ranking it as the 18th biggest hit of the year. The song also reached #15 Adult Contemporary. Masekela included the song in his albums Grazing in the Grass: The Best of Hugh Masekela (2001), Still Grazing (2004), and Live at the Market Theatre (2006).

Masekela’s recording was inducted into the Grammy Hall of Fame in 2018.

A vocal version by The Friends of Distinction, with lyrics by band member Harry Elston, was a US chart hit in 1969.  "Grazing in the Grass" has been recorded by many other musicians.

Hugh Masekela recording
The music was inspired by an earlier novelty recording, "Mr. Bull No. 4", by Freddie Gumbi, which Masekela had heard in Zambia, that started with a cowbell.  When Masekela was recording his debut album, the running order was short by three minutes and his record company suggested he add the tune.  Philemon Hou, an actor and singer who was present in the studio, came up with a new melody while the backing track was already being recorded. The session was held at Gold Star Studios in Hollywood.

Personnel
Hugh Masekelatrumpet
Bruce Langhorneguitar
Al Abreualto sax
William Hendersonpiano
Henry Franklinbass
Chuck Carterdrums, cowbell

Charts

The Friends of Distinction version

The Friends of Distinction recorded a vocal remake of the tune in 1969 on RCA Victor, which was also a Top Ten pop and R&B hit, reaching #3 on the former and #5 on the latter. One of the group's members, Harry Elston, wrote lyrics for the song and sang lead on the Friends Of Distinction's version of it.

Personnel
The Friends of Distinctionvocals
Max Bennettelectric bass
Jim Gordondrums
Al Casey and Arthur Wrightguitars
Gene Ciprianopiccolo flute
John Audino, Anthony Terran, Bud Childers, Dalton Smithtrumpets
King Errissoncongas
Douglas Daviscello
Jim Horntenor saxophone
Garry Nuttycombeviola
Harry Bluestone, Jimmy Getzoffviolins
Jack Arnoldpercussion
Larry Knechtelpiano

Legacy 
The Friends of Distinction appear, performing the song on  Peter Griffin's lawn, in S17 Episode 8 of the adult animated sitcom Family Guy, as part of a dream sequence.

A cover by Raven was in the end credits of the animated film The Lion King 1½.

Chart performance

Weekly charts

Year-end charts

References

External links 
 Lyrics of this song
  (2016)
 

 

1968 singles
1969 debut singles
2004 singles
Billboard Hot 100 number-one singles
Cashbox number-one singles
The Friends of Distinction songs
Hugh Masekela songs
Raven-Symoné songs
1968 songs
RCA Victor singles
Uni Records singles
Hollywood Records singles
1960s instrumentals